Xiang Xiang may refer to:

Xiang Xiang (singer), a Chinese popular singer
Xiang Xiang (giant panda), a famous giant panda born in China in 2001
Xiang Xiang (giant panda, born 2017), a famous giant panda born in Japan

See also
Xiangxiang